Beddington Heights is an established suburban neighbourhood in northwest Calgary, Alberta, Canada. The community is bounded by Berkshire Boulevard to the north, Beddington Trail to the east, Beddington Boulevard to the south and 14th Street W to the west.

Beddington Heights is in Ward 4.

Demographics

Residents in this community had a median household income of $56,881 in 2000, and there were 14.4% low income residents living in the neighbourhood. As of 2000, 27.5% of the residents were immigrants, and few of the buildings (1.9%) were condominiums or apartments, and 21.4% were used for renting.

History
The community was originally named after the village of Beddington in Surrey, England. The area's original development began as a Canadian Pacific Railway station. The establishment of the neighbourhood of Beddington Heights occurred in 1979.

Education
As of 2020, there are two schools in the neighborhood:
 Beddington Heights Elementary School - Calgary Board of Education
 St. Bede Elementary School - Calgary Catholic School District

Shopping 
Beddington Heights contains a concentrated commercial area along Centre Street. Centre Street hosts the Calgary Co-op and Safeway. Additionally, the Beddington Towne Centre and the adjacent area contains multiple bars, restaurants, small stores, banks and a London Drugs location. 

Bedford Drive, within the vicinity of Nose Creek Park, contains a small strip mall that houses multiple take-out restaurants and a liquor store.

See also
List of neighbourhoods in Calgary

References

External links
Calgary Area. Beddington Heights Community Info

Neighbourhoods in Calgary